Rikki and Me was a stage show celebrating the life of comic actor Rikki Fulton, it starred Gerard Kelly and Tony Roper as Jack Milroy and Rikki Fulton. The show was a huge success all over theatres in Scotland and is now available on DVD.

References

External links
 

Scottish plays
Cultural depictions of actors
Cultural depictions of comedians
Cultural depictions of Scottish men
Biographical plays about actors
Plays based on real people
Plays set in Scotland